The Journal of Clinical Lipidology is a bimonthly peer-reviewed medical journal covering medical aspects of lipidology. It was established in 2007 and is the official journal of the National Lipid Association. It is published by Elsevier and the editor-in-chief is John Richard Guyton (Duke University Medical Center). According to the Journal Citation Reports, the journal has a 2017 impact factor of 3.580.

References

External links

Elsevier academic journals
Biochemistry journals
Publications established in 2007
Bimonthly journals
English-language journals
Academic journals associated with learned and professional societies of the United States